Nikolaj Hansen may refer to:

 Nikolaj Hansen (footballer, born 1987), Danish footballer for FC Roskilde
 Nikolaj Hansen (footballer, born 1993), Danish footballer for Víkingur
 Niko Hansen (born 1994), Danish footballer for Columbus Crew SC

See also 
 Nikolaj Koch-Hansen (born 1986), Danish handball player